Eric Anthony Fornataro (born January 2, 1988) is an American former professional baseball pitcher. He played in Major League Baseball (MLB) for the St. Louis Cardinals.

Career

St. Louis Cardinals
The St. Louis Cardinals selected Fornataro in the sixth round, with the 185th overall selection, in the 2008 MLB Draft from Miami-Dade Community College. Fornataro was added to the Cardinals' 40 man roster after the 2012 season. He made his major league debut on April 21, 2014.

Washington Nationals
Fornataro was claimed off waivers by the Washington Nationals on November 3, 2014. The Nationals designated him for assignment in February 2015.

Baltimore Orioles
On April 8, 2016, Fornataro signed a minor league deal with the Baltimore Orioles. He was released on April 19, 2016.

Southern Maryland Blue Crabs
On July 24, 2017, Fornataro was traded to the Southern Maryland Blue Crabs of the Atlantic League of Professional Baseball.

On November 1, 2017, he became a free agent.

References

External links

1988 births
Living people
St. Louis Cardinals players
Miami Dade Sharks baseball players
Gulf Coast Cardinals players
Johnson City Cardinals players
Batavia Muckdogs players
Quad Cities River Bandits players
Palm Beach Cardinals players
Springfield Cardinals players
Memphis Redbirds players
Baseball players from Houston
Syracuse Chiefs players
Southern Maryland Blue Crabs players
New Britain Bees players
Major League Baseball pitchers
Naranjeros de Hermosillo players
American expatriate baseball players in Mexico